Helminthascus is a genus of fungi within the Clavicipitaceae family. This is a monotypic genus, containing the single species Helminthascus arachnophthorus.

References

External links
Index Fungorum

Clavicipitaceae
Monotypic Sordariomycetes genera